12 Lagu Islami Terbaik - Fatin & Friends is a 12 track compilation album by various artists that was released through Sony Music Entertainment Indonesia on 24 June 2014. This album, 12 Lagu Islami Terbaik - Fatin & Friends  features a 12 tracks Islamic songs, in which many have that song so popular in Ramadhan. There is new songs from this album, "Proud of You Moslem" and "Oh Tuhan", sung by Fatin Shidqia, which become first single from this album. This album only sold in Gramedia bookstore and iTunes.

Track listing

References 

2014 compilation albums